New York's 75th State Assembly district is one of the 150 districts in the New York State Assembly. It has been represented by Tony Simone since 2023, succeeding 52-year former Assemblyman Richard Gottfried.

Geography
District 75 is in Manhattan. The district includes Chelsea, Hell's Kitchen, Midtown Manhattan and the Upper West Side. The Empire State Building, Madison Square Garden, Times Square, Rockefeller Center, and the southern portion of Central Park are included in this district.

Prior to redistricting in 2022, the district included Murray Hill.

Recent election results

2022

2020

2018

2016

2014

2012

2010

2008

References

75